Bob Weltlich (born November 5, 1944) is an American former college basketball coach and author. Weltlich coached 22 seasons with a career record of 300–335. He was head coach at the University of South Alabama, Florida International University (FIU), University of Texas and University of Mississippi (Ole Miss). Weltlich is one of only 19 coaches to lead three different programs to the NCAA Division I men's basketball tournament.

Coaching career

Indiana
Weltlich got his degree in education from Ohio State University in 1967 and was set to teach. He met Army coach and fellow OSU alum Bob Knight in Orrville, Ohio. Knight hired him as an assistant at Army, then took him to Indiana University, where in 1976 he helped coach a 32–0 team to the NCAA title.

Ole Miss
Weltlich left Indiana to become the head coach at the University of Mississippi. Weltlich manned the Rebel sidelines for six years (1977–1982) and directed Ole Miss to an SEC Tournament title and the program’s postseason debut in 1981. One episode of his aggressive coaching style, foreshadowing criticism levied against him later in his career, followed the team splitting two games in Illinois in 1979; after an all-night marathon bus/plane/bus trip that arrived back on campus on Christmas Day, Weltlich had the team dress for a tape session and practice. (This is described from player Sean Tuohy's point of view in both Michael Lewis' 2006 book The Blind Side, pp. 55–56; and Sean and Leigh Anne Tuohy's own 2010 book "In a Heartbeat, Sharing The Power of Cheerful Giving", p. 48,) Upon setting up the projector to watch film (at 10 am on Christmas Day), Weltlich leaned into Tuohy's ear and said, "Hey Twelve, Merry Fucking Christmas."

Texas
In 1982, second-year Texas athletic director DeLoss Dodds hired Weltlich from Ole Miss to serve as the next Texas Longhorns men's basketball head coach. Nicknamed "Kaiser Bob" by Longhorn fans for his harshly disciplinarian approach, Weltlich was almost immediately faced with such a manpower shortage from the departures — both voluntary and involuntary — of so many Texas players that he famously had to press Texas male cheerleader Lance Watson into service during the Longhorns' abysmal 6–22 season of 1982–83.

Weltlich coached the US national team in the 1982 FIBA World Championship, winning the silver medal.

Weltlich's next three teams posted yearly improvements in overall records, with the 1985–86 team — which finished with a 19–12 mark and a share of the Southwest Conference Championship — representing the zenith of his tenure at Texas. After his teams finished 14–17 and 16–13 in the 1986–87 and 1987–88 seasons, respectively, Weltlich was dismissed with two years remaining on his contract.

Weltlich compiled a 77–98 record during six seasons as the head coach at Texas. None of his six teams managed an appearance in the NCAA Division I men's basketball tournament; only the 1985–86 team participated in postseason competition, losing 71–65 to Ohio State in the second round of the National Invitation Tournament (NIT).

FIU
Weltlich served as head coach at Florida International University (FIU) from 1990 to 1995.

Under Weltlich, the Panthers made their lone appearance in the NCAA Tournament in 1995, losing to Jim Harrick's UCLA Bruins, 92–56, in the round of 64. Weltlich had already announced his resignation effective at the end of the season and notably said during the post-game interviews "If anyone knows of any openings out there, my number is...".

South Alabama
Weltlich was named the interim coach at the University of South Alabama on October 27, 1997 following Bill Musselman's sudden resignation on October 7, 1997. Weltlich coached the Jags from 1997 to 2002 and compiled a record of 81-65 and three 20-win seasons. He resigned from South Alabama after the 2002 season, but he and his family remained in Fairhope, Alabama, where he has worked as a middle school teacher to complete the 10 years of service he needed to qualify for retirement from the state of Alabama.

Head coaching record

Novel
In 2004, Weltlich's novel, Crooked Zebra, was released. It tells the story of a college basketball referee who begins to affect outcomes of games based on his gambling habits.

References

1944 births
Living people
21st-century American novelists
21st-century American male writers
American crime fiction writers
American male novelists
Basketball coaches from Alabama
FIU Panthers men's basketball coaches
Indiana Hoosiers men's basketball coaches
Novelists from Alabama
Ohio State University College of Education and Human Ecology alumni
Ole Miss Rebels men's basketball coaches
People from Fairhope, Alabama
South Alabama Jaguars men's basketball coaches
Texas Longhorns men's basketball coaches
United States men's national basketball team coaches